The Tryon Coterie, also known as Try-C, is the oldest of Baylor University’s men’s social clubs.

Tryon Coterie affiliated with Phi Delta Theta in 1977 and is now part of the Texas Lambda chapter of Phi Delta Theta.

The fraternity chapter to this day models itself as Phi Delta Theta-The Tryon Coterie , making it unique among Phi Delt chapters nationwide.

History

The Tryon Coterie is the oldest of Baylor University’s men’s social clubs. It was named after one of Baylor University’s three founders, Reverend William Milton Tryon. A minister in the Southern Baptist Convention, and Confederate chaplain. The word Coterie was chosen as it represents a "Gathering of Friends".

In 1976-1977 Tryon Coterie converted to Phi Delta Theta, as many of the fraternities began to transfer from Local to National names, however continues to use its original name, known as Phi Delta Theta-The Tryon Coterie.

Activities

The fraternity founded the Great Gloomy Gathering tradition of members wearing basic tuxedos, and dates wearing black gowns to a formal ball held in New Orleans at the Le Pavillon Hotel, and Houmas House Plantation , to "mourn" the start of finals.

The fraternity also regularly hosts its "Spring Fling" at Horseshoe Bay, Texas Country Club.

In 1974-75 Try-C won the Class C division with their float when BU played Texas A&M University at Homecoming.   In 1975-1976, Try-C captured 1st place with their float in the Class A division.   They participated in All-University Sing, a Baylor tradition, and received 4th place that year. Try-C also won the University Championship in tennis & softball that year.  
 
 
In 1977-1978 Phi Delta Theta won 1st place in football intramurals and with their Class A float.   In spring they won 2nd place in softball intramurals and placed 8th in Sing.

Famous Alumni
Texas Lambda Alumni have donated extensively to Baylor. Many landmark buildings are named after the clubs alumni, including Clifton Robinson Tower, Turner Athletic Complex, and the Ferrell Center. The following are Tryon Coterie's alums.

Clifton Robinson - Graduated 1954 - Former CEO of National Insurance 
Mark White - Graduated 1956 - Former Governor of Texas (1983–87) 
Jim Turner - Graduated 1969 - Former CEO of Dr Pepper and current Chair of the Baylor Board of Regents 
Mark Hurd - Graduated 1977 - Former CEO and Chairman of Hewlett Packard 
Trey Wingo - Graduated 1985 - Sports Journalist/Anchor for ESPN 
Max Sandlin - Graduated 1975 - Former Congressman representing Texas District 1 (1997–2005)
Stan Moore - Graduated 1978 - 2 Time Emmy Award Winner, Texas Stuntman Association

External links

References 

Baylor University
Student organizations established in 1946
1946 establishments in Texas